In fluid dynamics, convective mixing is the vertical transport of a fluid and its properties. In many important ocean and atmospheric phenomena, convection is driven by density differences in the fluid, e.g. the sinking of cold, dense water in polar regions of the world's oceans; and the rising of warm, less-dense air during the formation of cumulonimbus clouds and hurricanes.

See also
 Atmospheric convection
 Bénard cells
 Churchill–Bernstein equation
 Double diffusive convection
 Heat transfer
 Heat conduction
 Thermal radiation
 Heat pipe
 Laser-heated pedestal growth
 Nusselt number
 Thermomagnetic convection

References

Notes

Further reading
 

Convection